Fathi Ahmed (born 1991) is a Finnish–Somali actor and comedian. He is best known for his roles in the popular television serials Aurora, Aikuiset and Modernit miehet.

Personal life
He was born in Järvenpää, Finland to Somali parents. His parents moved to Finland and are first-generation immigrants.

Career
He first trained to be a chef. However, he moved to the entertainment industry and received the title of stand-up newcomer comedian in 2014. He also competed in TV2's Naurun tasapaino. He played several comedy shows in several Finnish cities. He became very popular with the comedy program, Naurun tasapaino.

Apart from stand-up comedy, he has also starred in several television series including Noin viikon uutiset, Aurora, Aikuiset and Modernit miehet where he started television career with the serial Siskonpeti in 2015. In the same year, he played the role 'African neighbor' in the popular serial Downshiftaajat.

Filmography

References

External links
 

Living people
People from Järvenpää
Finnish television actors
Finnish stand-up comedians
Finnish people of Somali descent
1991 births